Paramyiolia is a genus of tephritid  or fruit flies in the family Tephritidae.>

Species
These four species belong to the genus Paramyiolia:
 Paramyiolia cornuta (Ito, 1984) i c g
 Paramyiolia nigricornis (Doane, 1899) i c g b
 Paramyiolia rhino (Steyskal, 1972) i c g
 Paramyiolia takeuchii Shiraki, 1933 i c g
Data sources: i = ITIS, c = Catalogue of Life, g = GBIF, b = Bugguide.net

References

Trypetinae
Tephritidae genera